Diamond Grove may refer to the following places in the United States:

 Diamond Grove, Virginia in Brunswick County
 Diamond Grove, Wisconsin in Grant County
 Diamond, Missouri, formerly known as Diamond Grove